Solène Mazingue (born 11 February 2003) is a French ice dancer who currently competes for Estonia. With her current partner, Marko Jevgeni Gaidajenko, she is the 2021 JGP France II bronze medalist, the 2022 Estonian national champion, and competed in the final segment at the 2022 European Championships.

Personal life 
Mazingue was born on 11 February 2003 in Paris, France. As of 2022, she is a university student studying law.

Career

Early years 
Mazingue began learning how to skate in 2006 as a three-year-old. By the 2012–13 season, she was competing in ice dancing with Jean-Hans Fourneaux for France. The duo trained at Rouen Olympic Club in Rouen.

By 2018, Mazingue had teamed up with Maxime Dos Reis for France. Mazingue/Dos Reis competed together from 2018 to 2020. During their partnership, they appeared at six junior international events and finished sixth at the 2019 and 2020 French Junior Championships. The team split after the 2019–20 season.

In January 2021, Mazingue teamed up with Marko Jevgeni Gaidajenko for Estonia.

2021–2022 season 
Mazingue/Gaidajenko made their international debut in August at the 2021 JGP France II, the second of two events held in Courchevel. There, the team placed fifth in the rhythm dance but rose to third in the free dance to claim the bronze medal overall behind American teams Oona Brown / Gage Brown and Isabella Flores / Dimitry Tsarevski. Their medal marked the first medal for Estonia on the Junior Grand Prix circuit in ice dance since 2011. At their second JGP event, the 2021 JGP Austria, Mazingue/Gaidajenko finished ninth.

Moving up to the senior level, Mazingue/Gaidajenko made their Challenger Series debut in November at the 2021 CS Warsaw Cup. They placed fifteenth at the event. Later in December, they won their first senior national title at the 2022 Estonian Championships before returning to the Challenger Series at the 2021 CS Golden Spin of Zagreb, where they finished ninth. Due to their placement at Estonian nationals, Mazingue/Gaidajenko were assigned to Estonia's berth in ice dance at the 2022 European Championships.

At Europeans, held in Gaidajenko's hometown Tallinn, Mazingue/Gaidajenko set a new personal best in the rhythm dance to qualify to the free dance in 20th place. They maintained their standing in the free dance and finished twentieth overall. Mazingue/Gaidajenko concluded the season at the 2022 World Championships, held in Montpellier with Russian dance teams absent due to the International Skating Union banning all Russian athletes due to their country's invasion of Ukraine. They qualified to the free dance and finished nineteenth.

Programs

With Gaidajenko

Competitive highlights 
CS: Challenger Series; JGP: Junior Grand Prix

With Gaidajenko for Estonia

With Dos Reis for France

With Fourneaux for France 

Levels: J = Junior; A = Advanced novice; B = Basic novice; Be = Benjamins; M = Minimes; C = Cadets

Detailed results

With Gaidajenko

Senior results

Junior results

References

External links 
 

Estonian female ice dancers
French female ice dancers
Sportspeople from Paris

Living people

2003 births